Maman (also Romanized as Mamān and Māmān; also known as Mamanlu) is a village in Garmeh-ye Jonubi Rural District, in the Central District of Meyaneh County, East Azerbaijan Province, Iran. At the 2006 census, its population was 889, in 280 families.

References 

Populated places in Meyaneh County